Mulhal Mughlan is a village and union council, an administrative subdivision, of Chakwal in the Punjab Province of Pakistan. It is part of Chakwal located on Sohawa Chakwal Road which leads to Talagang and Mianwali.

Since 1947 Chakwal was a part of District Jehlum. In 1984 Chakwal became a district with four tehsils. The district is administratively subdivided into four tehsils, name of Tehsil Chakwal Tehsil, Kallar Kahar Tehsil, Choa Saidan Shah Tehsil and Talagang Tehsil, Mulhal Mughlan was included in Tehsil Chakwal with Mulhal Mughlan Union Council.

Facilities
Mulhal Mughlan has facilities of government and private schools, private girls and boys colleges, banks, Pakistan post office, utility stores, government and private hospitals, Cable Tv and a PTCL telephone exchange.
Banks includes National Bank of Pakistan (NBP), United Bank Limited (UBL), Muslim Commercial Bank (MCB) and Bank Al-Habib Limited.
Public Transport from Mulhal Mughlan is available to Karachi, Lahore, Rawalpindi, Faisalabad, Chakwal, Gujrat, Gujranwala, Jhelum, Kharian, Sialkot, Wah Cantt, Kamra and Mirpur.

Oil & Gas Development Company Limited (OGDCL) has two operational fields (1) Rajian Oil Field and (2) Kal Oil Field in the vicinity of Mulhal Mughlan.

References

Union councils of Chakwal District
Populated places in Chakwal District
Education :Mulhal Mughlan is known as the town of education in Chakwal.